Léon Bergsma (born 25 January 1997) is a Dutch professional footballer who plays for Cambuur as a centre back.

Club career
Bergsma is a youth exponent from AFC Ajax. He made his professional debut with Jong Ajax on 8 May 2015 in an Eerste Divisie game against TOP Oss replacing Leeroy Owusu after 88 minutes.

On 28 July 2022, Bergsma signed a three-year contract with Cambuur.

Honours
Jong Ajax
 Eerste Divisie: 2017–18

References

1997 births
Living people
Footballers from Amsterdam
Association football defenders
Dutch footballers
Dutch expatriate footballers
Netherlands youth international footballers
Blauw-Wit Amsterdam players
Jong Ajax players
AFC Ajax players
AZ Alkmaar players
Jong AZ players
FC Den Bosch players
FC Aarau players
SC Cambuur players
Eredivisie players
Eerste Divisie players
Swiss Challenge League players
Dutch expatriate sportspeople in Switzerland
Expatriate footballers in Switzerland